Colotis daira, the black-marked orange tip, is a butterfly in the family Pieridae. It is found in the Nigeria, Sudan, Ethiopia, Somalia, Saudi Arabia, Yemen, Oman, Kenya and Tanzania. The habitat consists of dry savanna.

Both sexes are attracted to flowers.

The larvae feed on Capparis and Cadaba species.

Subspecies
Colotis daira daira (south-western Saudi Arabia, Yemen, Oman)
Colotis daira jacksoni (Sharpe, 1890) (eastern Kenya, north-eastern Tanzania)
Colotis daira stygia (Felder & Felder, 1865) (north-eastern Nigeria, Sudan, southern Ethiopia, Somalia, northern and western Kenya)

References

Butterflies described in 1829
daira